English Bazar Municipality is responsible for the civic administration of the town of Malda in Malda district, West Bengal, India. Established in 1868, it is one of the oldest Municipalities in India.

Geography

Councillors of Municipality

Councillors of E.B.M (2015–2020)

Councillors of E.B.M 2010-2015

References

Municipalities of West Bengal